Paty Díaz (born Patricia Díaz, March 17, 1974, in San Luis Río Colorado, Sonora, Mexico) is a Mexican actress and model.

Filmography

References

External links

1976 births
Living people
Mexican telenovela actresses
Mexican television actresses
Mexican female models
20th-century Mexican actresses
21st-century Mexican actresses
Actresses from Sonora
People from San Luis Río Colorado